Isac Viana Santos (born 13 December 1990) is a Brazilian professional volleyball player. He is a member of the Brazil national team. A silver medallist at the 2018 World Championship and the 2019 World Cup winner. At the professional club level, he plays for the Indonesian team, Jakarta STIN BIN.

Honours

Clubs
 FIVB Club World Championship
  Betim 2013 – with Sada Cruzeiro
  Betim 2015 – with Sada Cruzeiro
  Betim 2016 – with Sada Cruzeiro
  Betim 2019 – with Sada Cruzeiro
  Betim 2021 – with Sada Cruzeiro

 CSV South American Club Championship
  Belo Horizonte 2014 – with Sada Cruzeiro
  Taubate 2016 – with Sada Cruzeiro
  Montes Claros 2017 – with Sada Cruzeiro
  Montes Claros 2018 – with Sada Cruzeiro
  Belo Horizonte 2019 – with Sada Cruzeiro
  Contagem 2020 – with Sada Cruzeiro

 National championships
 2013/2014  Brazilian Cup, with Sada Cruzeiro
 2013/2014  Brazilian Championship, with Sada Cruzeiro
 2014/2015  Brazilian Championship, with Sada Cruzeiro
 2015/2016  Brazilian SuperCup, with Sada Cruzeiro
 2015/2016  Brazilian Cup, with Sada Cruzeiro
 2015/2016  Brazilian Championship, with Sada Cruzeiro
 2016/2017  Brazilian SuperCup, with Sada Cruzeiro
 2016/2017  Brazilian Championship, with Sada Cruzeiro
 2017/2018  Brazilian SuperCup, with Sada Cruzeiro
 2017/2018  Brazilian Cup, with Sada Cruzeiro
 2017/2018  Brazilian Championship, with Sada Cruzeiro
 2018/2019  Brazilian Cup, with Sada Cruzeiro
 2019/2020  Brazilian Cup, with Sada Cruzeiro
 2020/2021  Brazilian Cup, with Sada Cruzeiro

Youth national team
 2008  CSV U21 South American Championship
 2009  FIVB U21 World Championship

Individual awards
 2013: Pan American Cup – Best Middle Blocker
 2014: CSV South American Club Championship – Best Middle Blocker
 2015: CSV South American Championship – Best Middle Blocker
 2016: CSV South American Club Championship – Best Middle Blocker
 2018: CSV South American Club Championship – Best Middle Blocker
 2019: CSV South American Club Championship – Best Middle Blocker

References

External links

 Player profile at Volleybox.net

1990 births
Living people
People from São Gonçalo, Rio de Janeiro
Sportspeople from Rio de Janeiro (state)
Brazilian men's volleyball players
Olympic volleyball players of Brazil
Volleyball players at the 2020 Summer Olympics
Brazilian expatriate sportspeople in Italy
Expatriate volleyball players in Italy
Middle blockers